David Martin (born February 3, 1988, in Denver, Colorado) is an American soccer player who currently plays for Colorado Rush.

External links

1988 births
Living people
Soccer players from Colorado
American soccer players
Charlotte 49ers men's soccer players
Fort Lauderdale Strikers players
VSI Tampa Bay FC players
USL Championship players
Association football goalkeepers